Harry Leroy Kelley (February 13, 1906 – March 23, 1958) was an American professional baseball pitcher. He played in Major League Baseball (MLB) from 1925 to 1926 and again from 1936 to 1939 for the Washington Senators and Philadelphia Athletics. In between, he pitched mainly for the Memphis Chicks of the Southern Association. He was born in 1906 in the town of Parkin, Arkansas, and died there in 1958.

Sources

1906 births
1958 deaths
Major League Baseball pitchers
Washington Senators (1901–1960) players
Philadelphia Athletics players
Baseball players from Arkansas
Greenwood Indians players
Spartanburg Spartans players
Memphis Chickasaws players
New Orleans Pelicans (baseball) players
Birmingham Barons players
Atlanta Crackers players
Minneapolis Millers (baseball) players
Indianapolis Indians players
People from Parkin, Arkansas